Smrk may refer to:
 Smrk (Jizera Mountains), the highest mountain in the Jizera Mountains of Bohemia, Czech Republic at 1124m
 Smrk (Moravian-Silesian Beskids), a mountain in the Moravian-Silesian Beskids range in the Czech Republic
 Smrk (Třebíč District), Vysočina, Czech Republic